Dave Brubeck: In His Own Sweet Way is a 2010 documentary film about jazz pianist Dave Brubeck. It was directed and produced by Bruce Ricker with Clint Eastwood as executive producer for Turner Classic Movies (TCM) to commemorate Brubeck's 90th birthday in December 2010. It aired on his birthday, December 6, 2010.

References

External links
 
 All About Jazz article

2010 television films
2010 films
Turner Classic Movies original programming
Documentary films about jazz music and musicians
American documentary television films
2010 documentary films
2010s American films